The 39th Citra Awards, presented by Indonesian Film Board and Ministry of Education, Culture, Research, and Technology, honored the achievement in Indonesian cinema released from 1 October 2018 to 30 September 2019. The ceremony was held on 8 December 2019 at the Opus Ballroom, The Tribata, Jakarta, Indonesia, and presented by journalist Rory Asyari and announcer Melissa Karim.

Drama film Memories of My Body won eight awards, including Best Picture. Other winners included Gundala with three, Cemara's Family and Two Blue Stripes with two and 27 Steps of May, Help is on the Way, How Far I'll Go, My Stupid Boss 2, No One Is Crazy in This Town and Nussa Bisa with one.

Winners and nominees
The nominations were announced on 12 November 2019. The nominations were led by Memories of My Body, This Earth of Mankind and Two Blue Stripes with twelve each, while 27 Steps of May, Glorious Days and Gundala followed with nine each.

Winners are listed first, highlighted in boldface, and indicated with a double dagger (‡).

Films with multiple nominations and awards

References

External links

Citra Awards
2019 film awards